USS Dragon was a small 118-ton steamer acquired by the Union Navy during the start of the American Civil War.

Dragon's primary assignment was to participate as a gunboat in the Union blockade of the ports and waterways of the Confederate States of America.

Service history 

Dragon, a screw steamer, was purchased at New York City in December 1861; outfitted at New York Navy Yard; and sailed 20 December 1861, Acting Master W. Watson in command, to join the North Atlantic Blockading Squadron at Hampton Roads, Virginia. On 8 March 1862 Dragon participated in the famous engagement in Hampton Roads between United States and Confederate naval forces during which Cumberland and Congress were sunk by the ironclad Virginia.

When the battle was renewed the following day Dragon endeavored to get  afloat but was halted when a shot from one of Virginia's rifled guns entered her boiler, exploding and causing severe damage. She was sent to Baltimore, Maryland, for repairs. Returning to Hampton Roads 22 April 1862, Dragon was again assigned to duty with the James River Flotilla and continued to patrol in the James until 29 August 1862 when she was transferred to the Potomac Flotilla. She patrolled the Potomac and Rappahannock Rivers helping enforce the blockade between Maryland and Virginia until 25 April 1865. Dragon arrived at Washington Navy Yard the following day, was decommissioned there 13 May 1865 and sold 20 July 1865.

References

See also 

 Confederate States Navy

Ships of the Union Navy
Steamships of the United States Navy
Gunboats of the United States Navy
American Civil War patrol vessels of the United States